Below is a list of countries which have signed and ratified one or more multilateral international copyright treaties.   This list covers only multilateral treaties (i.e., treaties by more than two countries).  It does not include bilateral treaties (treaties between only two countries).  Related rights provide intellectual property rights for performers, producers of sound recordings (phonograms) and broadcasting organisations. In some countries these rights are known simply as copyright, while other countries distinguish them from authors' rights: in either case, the international laws which are concerned with them are distinct from those concerned with literary and artistic works under the Berne Convention for the Protection of Literary and Artistic Works and other treaties.

Treaties

In addition to these treaties, the Anti-Counterfeiting Trade Agreement (ACTA) is a multilateral treaty governing multiple aspects of intellectual property, including copyright.  , ACTA has been signed by 31 countries, but only ratified by Japan.  If ACTA is ratified by six or more signatories, it will enter into force thirty days later.

, Eritrea, Marshall Islands, Nauru, Palau, and WTO Observer countries Iran, Iraq, Ethiopia, Somalia, South Sudan and Timor-Leste are not a party to any copyright convention.

Maps

Table of parties
The list below was taken from details supplied by WIPO, UNESCO and the WTO (see references): they are
correct as of 2005-12-11 (2000-01-01 for the Universal Copyright Convention), and include some accessions after that date. Dates quoted are the date on which the treaty came into effect for a given country.

See also 
List of parties to international related rights treaties
List of parties to international patent treaties

References

 
Lists of parties to treaties
International agreements